Glipostenoda castaneicolor is a species of beetle in the genus Glipostenoda. It was described in 1950.

References

castaneicolor
Beetles described in 1950